Qaraguz-e Hajji Baba (also Romanized as Qarāgūz-e Ḩājjī Bābā; also known as Qarāgūz-e Ḩājjī Āqā and Qareh Gūz-e Ḩājjībābā) is a village in Nazluy-ye Jonubi Rural District, in the Central District of Urmia County, West Azerbaijan Province, Iran. At the 2006 census, its population was 146, in 43 families.

References 

Populated places in Urmia County